John Alexander was the defending champion but lost in the quarterfinals to Jimmy Connors. 
Connors won in the final 6–4, 6–4 against Roscoe Tanner.

Seeds

Draw

Finals

Top half

Section 1

Section 2

Bottom half

Section 3

Section 4

References
 1976 American Airlines Tennis Games Draw - Men's Singles

American Airlines Tennis Games - Singles